Fota railway station serves Fota Island in County Cork.

It is a station on the Cork to Cobh commuter service. Travel to Glounthaune station to transfer to Midleton.

Description

The halt is unstaffed. There are two platforms, with level access to the Cobh-bound platform. Access to the Cork-bound platform is via a footbridge, although there is a defunct level crossing which can theoretically (albeit illegally) be used to cross the tracks.

At both ends of the station is a viaduct; The Belvelly viaduct is at the Cobh end and the Slatty Viaduct is at the Cork end.

It is used by tourists, walkers, and people working on the Island alike. Fota Island is home to a wildlife park, scout camp, Fota House and Gardens, a championship golf course and hotel.

History

The station opened on 1 July 1865.

See also
 List of railway stations in Ireland

References

External links
Irish Rail Fota Station Website

Iarnród Éireann stations in County Cork
Railway stations in County Cork
Railway stations opened in 1865